Gaddi Baithak is a neoclassical palace in Kathmandu Durbar Square. It was built by Chandra Shumsher Jang Bahadur Rana in 1908, and it was used for to coronations and to welcome head of states from other countries.

References

External links 
 

Palaces in Kathmandu
Rana palaces of Nepal
Kathmandu Durbar Square
Neoclassical architecture
1908 establishments in Nepal